Prince Hwaui (5 September 1425 – 1460), personal name Yi Yeong, was a prince of the Joseon Dynasty of Korea. He was the sixth son of Sejong the Great and younger brother of Munjong of Joseon and Sejo of Joseon.

Life 
Yi Yeong was born on 5 September 1425 as the sixth son King Sejong, by his concubine, Royal Noble Consort Yeong of the Jinju Kang clan.

In January 1433, he was granted the title of Prince Hwaui. In the 20th year of King Sejong (1438), he entered Sungkyunkwan. On October 8 of the same year, he married Lady Park, daughter of Park Jung-son (박중손), as his primary wife.

In 1441, he conspired with his half-brother, Grand Prince Imyeong, to bring a civilian woman into the palace in men's clothes.

He was impeached and exiled several times for participating in the movement against Prince Suyang to restore King Danjong.

After that, all property, including slaves and fields, were confiscated, and the children were demoted to the lowly status. His family was exiled for nearly 30 years. He was released during the reign of King Seongjong but was reinstated only during the reign of King Jungjong.

Family
Parents
Father: Sejong the Great of Joseon (15 May 1397 – 8 April 1450)
Grandfather: King Taejong of Joseon (13 June 1367 – 30 May 1422)
Grandmother: Queen Wongyeong of the Yeoheung Min clan (11 July 1365 – 10 July 1420)
Mother: Royal Noble Consort Yeong of the Jinju Kang clan
Grandfather: Kang Seok-deok
Grandmother: Lady Sim of the Cheongseong Sim clan ()
Great-grandfather: Shim On () (1375 – 18 January 1419) 
Consorts and issue:
Princess Consort, of the Miryang Park clan, daughter of Park Joong-son
First Son: Yi Won (이원), Prince Yeoheung
Second Son: Yi Beon (이번), Prince Yeoseong( )
Third Son: Yi Sik (이식), Prince Geumransu
Concubine: Lady Annan
Son: Yi Geonli-dong
Concubine: Lady Naeun-geum
Son: Yi Su-dal
Concubine: Daughter of Gam Ji
Son: Yi Paeng-su
Unknown Concubine
Son: Unknown name

References 

1425 births
1460 deaths
Joseon scholar-officials